Lisa Martin  (born 23 May 1972) is an Australian para-equestrian. She represented Australia at the 2016 Rio Paralympics.

Personal
Martin was born on 23 May 1972. She grew up in Scone, New South Wales. At the age of 28, a horse riding accident led to her fibula splitting and crushing into the bottom of her foot and a fall six weeks later caused further damage to her leg. After 20 operations in two years, her ankle was fused and her achillies tendon cut, she has less than 15 per cent movement in her ankle joint. She works as a dressage trainer and instructor.

Equestrian
Martin's heritage is in the equestrian world as she grew up in a family of Australian Stock Horse breeders in Scone. In her youth,  she competed in eventing, polocrosse, showjumping and dressage and trained under the guidance of Rozzie and Olympian Heath Ryan. Fourteen years after the accident, she was approached to consider riding in para-equestrian events. Initially, Martin declined the offer to compete against people in a wheelchair. Martin was then told that wasn't the way paras worked, and was told the classifications and explained how they did work.  Martin was classified as a Grade IV rider. Although she still competes in able bodied events, Martin said para-equestrian has become very professional. She continued on by saying there's a lot of support and the people involved are "incredible to deal with".

At the 2016 Rio Paralympics, she rode First Famous, a German Warmblood mare. She finished fourth in three events - the Individual Championship Test Grade IV, Dressage individual Team Test Grade IV and Individual Freestyle Test Grade IV and was a member of the Australian Team that finished ninth in the Team Competition.

References

External links

International Equestrian Federation Profile and Results

Paralympic equestrians of Australia
Australian female equestrians
Equestrians at the 2016 Summer Paralympics
1972 births
Living people